Rhinestone Cowboy/Bloodline The Lambert & Potter Sessions 1975–1976 covers the complete Rhinestone Cowboy and Bloodline albums plus three bonus tracks.

Track listing

 "Country Boy (You Got Your Feet In LA)" (Dennis Lambert, Brian Potter) – 3:08
 "Comeback" (Dennis Lambert, Brian Potter) – 3:23
 "Count On Me" (Dennis Lambert, Brian Potter) – 3:12
 "I Miss You Tonight" (Dennis Lambert, Brian Potter) – 3:07
 "My Girl" (Smokey Robinson, Ronald White) – 3:14
 "Rhinestone Cowboy" (Larry Weiss) – 3:16
 "I'd Build A Bridge" (Settle) – 3:43
 "Pencils For Sale" (Cunningham) – 3:42
 "Marie" (Randy Newman) – 3:34
 "We're Over" (Barry Mann, Cynthia Weil) – 2:59
 "Baby Don't Be Giving Me Up" (Dennis Lambert, Brian Potter) – 3:31
 "See You On Sunday" (Dennis Lambert, Brian Potter) – 3:35
 "Don't Pull Your Love/Then You Can Tell Me Goodbye" (Dennis Lambert, Brian Potter, John D. Loudermilk) – 3:22
 "Christiaan No" (Jimmy Webb) – 2:34
 "Bloodline" (Geyer) – 4:32
 "Everytime I Sing A Love Song" (Sklerov, Molinary) – 3:09
 "Lay Me Down (Roll Me Out To Sea)" (Larry Weiss) – 3:09
 "The Bottom Line" (Dennis Lambert, Brian Potter) – 3:35
 "I Got Love For You Ruby" (Linzer) – 3:37
 "San Francisco Is A Lonely Town" (Peters) – 3:21
 "Record Collector's Dream" (Billy Graham) – 3:00
 "Houston (I'm Comin' To See You) (David Paich) – 3:19
 "Bonaparte's Retreat" (King) – 2:45

Production
Producers – Dennis Lambert, Brian Potter, Jimmy Bowen
Compiled by Pete Shillito, Glenn A. Baker, Kevin Mueller
Mastered by Warren Barnett, The Raven Lab
Design and layout by Gregg Klein, Alan Duffy
Photographs from The Glenn A. Baker Archives and original albums

References

Albums produced by Jimmy Bowen
2002 compilation albums
Glen Campbell compilation albums